Remuroa is a common name of Maori origin for several plants and may refer to:

 Solanum americanum
 Solanum nigrum, native to Eurasia